Alexakis is a Greek surname. The female form of the surname is Alexaki. Notable people with the surname include:

Art Alexakis (born 1962), American musician
Ioannis Sotiris Alexakis (1885–1980), Greek general
Vassilis Alexakis (born 1943), Greek-French writer and translator

Greek-language surnames